Carmignano is a comune (municipality)  in the province of Prato, part of the Italian region Tuscany. It is the centre of the wine region of the same name.

Geography
Carmignano borders the following municipalities: Capraia e Limite, Lastra a Signa, Montelupo Fiorentino, Poggio a Caiano, Prato, Quarrata, Signa, Vinci.

Main sights
The most important attraction of the town is the church of San Michele e San Francesco (12th century), which houses a Visitation by the Renaissance master Pontormo.

The 10th century Rocca (Castle), in the upper part of the town, is well preserved. The frazione of Comeana is home to several Etruscan tombs (such as the Tumulus of Montefortini), while at Artimino is a Medicean villa.

Churches
Abbey of San Martino
Chapel at Villa Le Falene
Chapel at Villa le Farnete
Little church in Castelvecchio
Little church of Toia in Bacchereto
Chapel at the Institute of the Sisters Stigmata
San Leonardo parish church in Artimino
Oratory of the Virgin and Holy Cross in Verrucola
Oratorio of San Francesco in Le Ginestre
Oratory of San Jacopo in Capezzana
Oratory of Sant'Antonio at Villa Novelli
Santi Michele e Francesco in Carmignano
San Giusto in Il Pinone
San Lorenzo in Montalbiolo
San Michele in Comeana
San Pietro in Seano
San Pietro in Verghereto
Santa Cristina in Santa Cristina in Mezzana
Santa Maria in Artimino
Santa Maria Assunta in Bacchereto

Villas
Villa in barchetto della Pineta
Medici Villa in Artimino
Villa Amata in Verrucola
Villa Batisti in Carmignano
Villa Batisti-Orlandi in Carmignano
Villa Brandani in Carmignano
Villa di Capezzana
Villa Casale in Carmignano
Villa Cremoncini in Carmignano
Villa della Costa in Carmignano
Villa della Rocca in Carmignano
Villa di Calavria in Comeana
Villa di Grumaggio in Grumaggio
Villa di Pianetto in Pianetto
Villa Elena in Il Poggiolo
Villa I Boschetti in La Serra
Villa I Renacci in I Renacci
Villa La Torre in Carmignano
Villa Le Falene in Le Farnete
Villa Le Farnete in Le Farnete
Villa Novelli in Colle Novelli
Villa Olmi in Carmignano
Villa Ramponi in Carmignano
Villa Rinfreschi in Castelvecchio
Villa san Michele in Carmignano
Villa Vittoria in Lazzera

Culture
Carmignano is  home to the following festivals:
Festival of San Michele and Palio of Donkeys in Carmignano (September–October)
Old Fair in Carmignano 4-11 (December)
Festival of the New Wine in Artimino (October)
Welcome Dried Fig ("Benvenuto Fico Secco") in Carmignano (October)
Comeana Fair (July)
Procession Commemorating the Passion and Death of Jesus Christ in Comeana (July every 3 years, last in 2012)
Festival of the Threshing in Seano (July)
The Fly and the Moon in Carmignano (October)
Festival of the Chestnut in Bacchereto (October)
Festival of the Cherry in Bacchereto (July)
Festival of Polenta, Porcini and Boar in Poggio alla Malva (September)

References

External links

 Official website
 Events in Prato and its province